Edmund ter Meer (31 July 1852 – 5 November 1931) was a German chemist who discovered the ter Meer reaction and founded in 1877 the ter Meer dye company in Uerdingen. After the fusion with the aniline factory of Julius Weiler the Weiler-ter Meer company was formed. This company later became part of the Bayer company. His son Fritz ter Meer  also became a chemist associated to the Bayer company.

References

*
ter Meer Prize University Bonn
"Ter Meer family." Global Anabaptist Mennonite Encyclopedia Online
Uerdingen industrial area history

1852 births
1931 deaths
20th-century German chemists
People from Krefeld
19th-century German chemists